Cochliopalpus is a genus of longhorn beetles of the subfamily Lamiinae.

 Cochliopalpus boranus Müller, 1938
 Cochliopalpus catherina (White, 1858)
 Cochliopalpus fimbriatus Aurivillius, 1928
 Cochliopalpus suturalis Harold, 1880

References

Ceroplesini